Wilhelm Nielsen can refer to:

 Wilhelm Nielsen (Danish footballer)
 Wilhelm Nielsen (Norwegian footballer)
 Wilhelm Nielsen (politician)